John Webb (born 10 February 1952) is an English former professional footballer who played as a full back. Webb, who was active in England and North America, made over 150 career league appearances.

Career
Born in Liverpool, Webb signed for hometown club Liverpool in February 1969. Webb was on the bench for five European appearances for Liverpool, but he never made a league appearance for the club, and spent a loan spell at Plymouth Argyle during the 1973–74 season. After leaving Liverpool in 1974, Webb moved to Tranmere Rovers, making 20 league appearances between 1974 and 1975. After a brief spell in Belgium with Bilzen, Webb then moved to the United States to play, and spent three seasons in the North American Soccer League with the Chicago Sting. Webb would return to the NASL in 1980, to play with the Edmonton Drillers. His two spells in the NASL were broken up by a spell in the Netherlands with MVV; after leaving the NASL following the culmination of the 1982 season, Webb returned to Belgium to play with Bilzerse VV.

References

1952 births
English footballers
Liverpool F.C. players
Plymouth Argyle F.C. players
Tranmere Rovers F.C. players
Chicago Sting (NASL) players
Edmonton Drillers (1979–1982) players
English Football League players
North American Soccer League (1968–1984) players
North American Soccer League (1968–1984) indoor players
Living people
Footballers from Liverpool
Association football fullbacks
English expatriate sportspeople in the United States
Expatriate soccer players in the United States
English expatriate footballers
English expatriate sportspeople in Canada
Expatriate soccer players in Canada